The Newry Democrat is a full colour newspaper serving Newry, County Down, Northern Ireland. It was published by Thomas Crosbie Holdings and in 2010 was acquired by the Alpha Newspaper Group, owned by John Taylor, Baron Kilclooney. 

In 2011, journalists on the paper voted to strike over forced redundancies.

References

External links
ulsternet.co and   Official website
Newry Democrat journalists suspend strike action - BelfastTelegraph.co.uk
BBC NEWS | UK | Northern Ireland | 12 jobs could go as papers merge

Mass media in County Down
Newspapers published in Northern Ireland
Newry
Thomas Crosbie Holdings